The Devil's Partner is a 1926 American silent Western film directed by Fred Becker and starring Edward Hearn, Carl Stockdale and Philo McCullough.

Cast
 Edward Hearn as Glen Wilson
 Nancy Deaver as Jane Martin
 Florence Lee as Deputy Sheriff's Wife
 Philo McCullough as Ramon Jennings - Border Rustler
 Carl Stockdale as James Martin - Rancher
 Harvey Clark as Henry Waffle - Deputy Sheriff
 Billie Latimer as Mrs. Henry Waffle
 Fred Becker as Pedro
 Will Walling as Sheriff McHenry
 Hayden Stevenson as Amos Wilson - Rancher

References

External links
 

1926 films
1926 Western (genre) films
American black-and-white films
Silent American Western (genre) films
1920s English-language films
1920s American films